The 1963 Tour de France started with 130 cyclists, divided into 13 teams:

The IBAC-Molteni team was a combination of five cyclists from IBAC and five from Molteni, each wearing their own sponsor's jerseys. 
The main favourite before the race was Jacques Anquetil, at that moment already a three-time winner of the Tour, including the previous two editions. Anquetil had shown good form before the Tour, as he won Paris–Nice, the Dauphiné Libéré, the Critérium National and the 1961 Vuelta a España. Anquetil was not sure if he would ride the Tour until a few days before the start; he had been infected by a tapeworm, and was advised not to start. Anquetil had chosen to ride races with tough climbs, to prepare for the 1963 Tour de France.
The major competitor was thought to be Raymond Poulidor, who had shown his capabilities in the 1962 Tour de France.

Start list

By team

By rider

By nationality

References

1963 Tour de France
1963